Prince Włodzimierz Alfons Czartoryski (1895–1975) was a Polish noble (szlachcic). He was the last owner of the Pełkinie, Wiazownica and Byliny land estates and the Szowsko industrial estate, before these were confiscated by the communist decree of nationalization on 3 January 1946.

He was the curator of the Czartoryski Museum in Kraków in the first years after World War II.

Włodzimierz married Countess Sophie Tyszkiewicz on 5 April 1923 in Krzeszowice. They had three children together: Paul Marie Czartoryski, Elisabeth Rose-Marie Czartoryska and Roza Maria Jadwiga Laurencja Czartoryska.

References

1895 births
1975 deaths
Wlodzimierz Alfons